The Heavy may refer to:

 The Heavy (album), the second album by American post-grungeband U.P.O.
 The Heavy (band), an indie rock band from Bath, England
 The Heavy (film), a 2010 thriller film
 The Heavy, a playable class from the video game mod Team Fortress
 The Heavy, a playable class from the video game Team Fortress 2